False Positive may refer to:
 False positive error, a result that incorrectly shows that a condition has been fulfilled
 False Positive (How I Met Your Mother), an episode of the US sitcom How I Met Your Mother
 False Positive, a magazine published by Donna Kossy
 False Positive (film), an American horror film

See also 
 "False positives" scandal, a series of murders in Colombia